Ferdinand Urbain Dominic Leclerc (1924 – 20 September 2010) was a Belgian singer, who was also the pianist of Juliette Gréco. Leclerc had a career as a pianist, accordionist, songwriter and singer before retiring to travel the world. On his return to Belgium he began a new career as a building contractor. More recently, Leclerc was invited to Belgian national final of Eurovision 2005 by the Belgian TV network RTBF as a guest star.

Leclerc represented Belgium at the Eurovision Song Contest four times:

The song Leclerc performed in the 1962 Contest is notable for being the (joint) first song performed at the Contest that scored zero points.

At the time of his death Leclerc was retired, and living in Brussels.

External links
 
 

People from Montluçon
1924 births
2010 deaths
Belgian male singers
Eurovision Song Contest entrants for Belgium
Eurovision Song Contest entrants of 1956
Eurovision Song Contest entrants of 1958
Eurovision Song Contest entrants of 1960
Eurovision Song Contest entrants of 1962
French-language singers of Belgium
Walloon musicians